Grande Meadows Golf Club is a public golf course located in Frenchman's Cove, Newfoundland, Canada.

History
Grande Meadows Golf Club, located on the north side of Burin Peninsula facing Fortune Bay, is the most southerly course in the province. The 9-hole course was designed by Robert Heaslip, who also undertook construction supervision. The course is built on a peninsula of level land with the Great Garnish Barasway bordering five holes around the perimeter; ponds and marshland come into play on at least two more holes.

See also
List of golf courses in Newfoundland and Labrador

References

External links
Official website

Golf clubs and courses in Newfoundland and Labrador
1995 establishments in Newfoundland and Labrador